HD 134606 is a yellow-hued star with a planetary system, positioned in the southern constellation of Apus. It is below the nominal limit for visibility with the naked eye, having an apparent visual magnitude of 6.86. The star appears to be moving further from the Earth with a heliocentric radial velocity of +2.3 km/s.

This is an evolving G-type subgiant star with a stellar classification of G6 IV and is not considered active, having a chromospheric activity index of −5.04. It has about the same mass as the Sun but is 25% more luminous. The photosphere is radiating energy at an effective temperature of 5,614 K. It has a higher than solar metallicity rating – a term astronomers use to describe the abundance of elements other than hydrogen and helium.

Planetary system
The discovery of a planetary system orbiting HD 134606 was announced in 2011 following an eight-year survey carried out at the La Silla Observatory in Chile. The detection was made via the radial velocity method using the HARPS instrument. Applying a Keplerian fit to the data suggests the presence of three planets in moderately eccentric orbits. The planets are successively larger the further away they are from the star. None of the planetary orbits displays a mean motion resonance with the others.

References

G-type subgiants
Planetary systems with three confirmed planets
Apus (constellation)
CD−70 1258
134606
074653
J15151504-7031105